Miravalles Volcano is an andesitic stratovolcano in Costa Rica.

Miravalles may also refer to:

Miravalles Jorge Manuel Dengo National Park, natural park in Costa Rica.
Ugao-Miraballes
Reynaldo Miravalles (1923–2016), Cuban actor
Jenaro Quesada, 1st Marquis of Miravalles (1818–1889), Spanish soldier

See also
Miravalle (disambiguation)